Werner Kreindl (October 20, 1927 – June 6, 1992) was an Austrian television actor.

He appeared in around 75 TV programmes between 1966 and his death in 1992. He was probably best known for his appearances in SOKO 5113 from 1978 to 1992.

Filmography

Film
1962: Two Bavarians in Bonn - Abgeordneter Dobler (uncredited)
1970:  - Herr Bertram Susmeit
1980:  - Dr. Lauscher
1980: The Formula - Schellenberg
1985: Seitenstechen - Doctor
1985: Die Einsteiger - Kommissar Gierke
1986: Die Schokoladenschnüffler - Sir Archibald Brington
1986: Geld oder Leber - Kommissar
1987:  - Thorwald
1990:  - Prof. Havlicek
1991: Der 13. Tag - Jan Masaryk

Television

1965: Zeitsperre (TV film) - Jarvis
1966: Freiheit im Dezember (TV film) - Lomow
1967: Nobile – Sieben Wochen auf dem Eis (TV miniseries) - Prof. Dr. Franz Behounek
1967: Der Reichstagsbrandprozess (TV film) - Göring
1969: Epitaph für einen König (TV film) - Graf Arvid Horn
1969: Amerika oder der Verschollene (TV film) - Green
1969: Der zweite Schuß (TV film) - Patrice
1970: Der Kommissar: Messer im Rücken (TV series episode) - Kurre
1970: Unter Kuratel (TV film) - Dr. M. C. Bellmann
1970: Ein ruhiges Heim (TV Short) - Herr Boulingrin
1970: Sir Henri Deterding (TV film) - Churchill
1970: Pakbo (TV film) - Dora
1970: Millionen nach Maß (TV miniseries) - Enrique Alcoferado
1970: Der Kirschgarten (TV film) - Kaufmann Lopachin
1971: Oliver (TV film) - Redakteur Sailer
1971: Der Kommissar: Tod eines Ladenbesitzers (TV series episode) - Sierich
1972: Die rote Kapelle (TV miniseries) - Leopold Trepper 
1972: Die Bilder laufen (TV film) - Charles Pathé
1974: Eine geschiedene Frau: Warten auf Ioannina (TV series episode) - Siebert
1974: Tatort: Gefährliche Wanzen (TV series episode) - Wöhrle
1974: Am Morgen meines Todes (TV film)
1974:  (TV film) - Dr. Ezra Jennings
1975: The Unguarded House (TV film) - Bresgote
1975: Derrick: Mitternachtsbus (TV series episode) - Oskar Holler
1975: Sonderdezernat K1: Sackgasse (TV series episode) - Georg Maertz
1975: Der Kommissar: Ein Mord auf dem Lande (TV series episode) - Krüger
1976: Minna von Barnhelm (TV film) - Werner
1976: Feinde (TV film) - Michail Skrobotow
1976:  (TV miniseries) - Doktor Banks
1976: Der Menschenfeind (TV film) - Philinte
1977: Walter Hasenclever (TV film) - Feuchtwanger
1977: Richelieu (TV miniseries) - Illo
1977: Roulette (TV film)
1978: Kleine Geschichten mit großen Tieren (TV film) - Chef
1978:  (TV miniseries) - Maximilian I.
1978: Holocaust (TV miniseries) - Herr Helms
1978: Stützen der Gesellschaft (TV film) - Konsul Bernick
1978–1992: SOKO 5113 (TV series, 126 episodes) - Kriminalhauptkommissar Karl Göttmann
1979: The Old Fox: Der Abgrund (TV series episode) - Dr. Albert Koll
1979: Die Quelle (TV film) - Eissenmann jun.
1979: Die großen Sebastians (TV film) - Sergeant Dobrowsky
1979: Augenblicke – 4 Szenen mit Paula Wessely (TV film) - Mann in der Gondelbahn
1980: Derrick: Tödliche Sekunden (TV series episode) - Albert Rudolf
1980: Der Fall Walrawe (TV film) - Walrawe
1980: The Old Fox: Vertrauensstellung (TV series episode) - Dr. Koch
1980: Knobbes Knoten (TV film) - Dr. Winter
1981: Die Wildente (TV film) - Hjalmar
1981:  (TV film) - Professor 'Gott' Kupfer
1981: The Old Fox: Urlaub aus dem Knast (TV series episode) - Bruno Kalvig
1982: Derrick: Eine Falle für Derrick (TV series episode) - Prosecutor
1982: The Old Fox: Der rote Faden (TV series episode) - Gustav Staschek
1982: Das Dorf an der Grenze (TV miniseries) - KPÖ-Sekretär
1982:  (TV miniseries) - Stadtstreicher
1983: The Winds of War (TV miniseries) - Colonel General Franz Halder
1983: Die Matrosen von Kronstadt (TV film) - Kusmin
1983–1985: Unsere schönsten Jahre (TV series) - Alfons Lehner
1984:  (TV film) - Dr.Raben
1984: The Old Fox: Von Mord war nicht die Rede (TV series episode) - Dr. Damholz
1985: Der eiserne Weg (TV miniseries) - Herr Kriele
1985: The Old Fox: Wiederholungstäter (TV series episode) - Herbert Hauser
1986: Auf den Tag genau (TV film)
1987:  (TV film) - Cornelius
1987: Top Kids (TV film) - Emil Jellinek
1988: Das Winterhaus (TV film)
1988: Hessische Geschichten (TV series episode) - Direktor Joachim Tobler
1989: Derrick: Blaue Rose (TV series episode) - Arthur
1991: Dido – Das Geheimnis des Fisches (TV miniseries) - Bischof
1991: Death Came As a Friend (TV film) - Korten

External links

Austrian male television actors
1927 births
1992 deaths
People from Wels
20th-century Austrian male actors
German Film Award winners